Alan Stephen Harper (born September 6, 1979) is a former American football defensive tackle who played one season with the New York Jets of the National Football League (NFL). He was drafted by the Jets in the fourth round of the 2002 NFL Draft. He played college football at Fresno State University.

Early years
Harper played high school football at Fontana High School in Fontana, California and graduated in 1997. He earned first-team All-Citrus Belt League and All-Inland Valley honors his senior year in 1996. He recorded 63 unassisted tackles, 24 assisted tackles, eight sacks and three pass deflections while the team went 11–1–1 in 1996. Harper attended A. B. Miller High School in Fontana his sophomore and junior years, garnering All-San Andreas League accolades twice.

College career
Harper played for the Fresno State Bulldogs from 1998 to 2001. He sat out the 1997 season while fulfilling academic requirements. He earned first-team All-WAC honors in 1999, 2000 and 2001. Harper was Fresno State's nominee for WAC Defensive Player of the Year in 1999 and won the award in 2001. He was also named a second-team All-American by The Sporting News his senior season in 2001.

Professional career

New York Jets/Scottish Claymores
Harper was selected by the New York Jets with the 121st pick in the 2002 NFL Draft and signed with the team on July 24, 2002. He was released by the Jets on October 15, 2003 and signed to the team's practice squad on October 16, 2003. He was promoted to the active roster on December 17, 2003. Harper was allocated to NFL Europe on February 9, 2004, where he played for the Scottish Claymores. He was named to the All-NFL Europe Team for his play during the 2004 season. He was released by the Jets on September 5 and signed to the team's practice squad on September 6, 2004. Harper was promoted to the active roster on September 27, 2004. He played in eleven games for the Jets during the 2004 season. He was released by the Jets on August 31, 2005.

San Jose SaberCats
Harper was signed by the San Jose SaberCats of the Arena Football League (AFL) on December 19, 2005. He played for the team from 2006 to 2008.

Arizona Rattlers
Harper signed with the Arizona Rattlers of the AFL on June 30, 2010 and played for the team during the 2010 season.

References

External links
Just Sports Stats

Living people
1979 births
Players of American football from California
American football defensive tackles
African-American players of American football
Fresno State Bulldogs football players
New York Jets players
Scottish Claymores players
Sportspeople from San Bernardino County, California
San Jose SaberCats players
Arizona Rattlers players
People from Fontana, California
21st-century African-American sportspeople
20th-century African-American sportspeople